Karl Fiala (born 30 January 1956 in Harlow, England) is a former motorcycle speedway rider.

Silver Helmet Match Race (September 1979)
Silver Helmet Match Race (October 1979) 
Knock-Out Cup Champions Rye House (1979)
National League Champions Rye House (1980)

Three outstanding performances.
(1). On 1 May 1977 winning a World Championship Qualifying round at Rye House with a 15-point maximum. (2) Rye House Rockets were away to Newcastle Diamonds where the Rockets won away 42-36 (25 April, Karl scoring a maximum 12 points). And (3) his proudest moment (quote from Karl), helping Rye House to win against Middlesbrough Bears on 9 October 1980 with a paid 15 point maximum having had to win the last race of the match to win the National League (speedway) Championship.

While racing for Rye House Rockets under the parent club Hackney Hawks, Karl also worked as an engineer for a company that made Life Support and Anaesthetic Equipment.
In 1988, he joined a Direct Mail Print Company and, in 2002, started his own business in this line, which is still running today.

A keen squash player until knee-joint problems forced retirement from league competition.

References
 Fenn, C. (2003). Hackney Speedway, Friday at Eight. .
 Jacobs, Norman (2007). 70 Years of Rye House Speedway.

External links
 http://www.ryehouserockets.co/clubhistory 
 http://www.crash.net/speedway/news/100114/1/silver-protest-brings-fine.html
 https://www.worldspeedwayriders.org/rider/29/karl-fiala

1956 births
British motorcycle racers
British speedway riders
Hackney Hawks riders
Rye House Rockets riders
Living people